"Goodbye Says It All" is a debut song by American country music band Blackhawk, written by Bobby Fischer, Charlie Black and Johnny MacRae. It was released in October 1993 as the lead single from their self-titled debut album. It peaked at #11 in the United States, and #29 in Canada. This song was heavily promoted on CMT.

Content
The song's narrator is sneaking home from an unknown location (presumably a tavern or a nightclub) "thinking up an alibi", only to find that the house is entirely empty and all of its lights are on. He discovers that, instead of attempting a reconciliation, his significant other has left, writing the word "goodbye" in red lipstick on the living room wall before she leaves.

Music video
The music video was directed by Marius Penczner. In the video, a man returns to a pontoon house to find that his significant other has abandoned him, and the word "goodbye" written in red lipstick on the exterior wall of the pontoon, and his belongings destroyed. She also leaves behind a videotape of her destroying his things. At the end of the video, the man drops the television set into the water, since his ex-girlfriend destroyed the television remote control.

Chart performance
The song entered the Billboard Hot Country Songs chart on the week of November 27, 1993, and peaked at number 11 on the week of March 12, 1994.

References

 Music video at Yahoo! Video

1993 debut singles
1993 songs
Blackhawk (band) songs
Arista Nashville singles
Song recordings produced by Mark Bright (record producer)
Songs written by Charlie Black
Songs written by Johnny MacRae